Pascal Leclaire (born November 7, 1982) is a Canadian former professional ice hockey goaltender. 

Leclaire was selected in the first round (eighth overall) of the 2001 NHL Entry Draft by the Columbus Blue Jackets and played in the Blue Jackets' organization for seven seasons. He was traded to the Ottawa Senators in 2009 and played in 48 regular season games with Ottawa over two seasons before retiring. 

Internationally, he has represented Canada on the national junior and men's teams.

Playing career
As a youth, Leclaire played in the 1996 Quebec International Pee-Wee Hockey Tournament with the Rive-Nord Elites minor ice hockey team.

Leclaire played junior hockey in the Quebec Major Junior Hockey League (QMJHL) for the Halifax Mooseheads and the Montreal Rocket between 1998 and 2002. Leclaire was the first goaltender selected in the 2001 NHL Entry Draft, chosen eighth overall by the Blue Jackets. He subsequently bounced back and forth between Columbus and their AHL affiliate, the Syracuse Crunch, from 2002 to 2005 before finally sticking with the Blue Jackets for good in 2006, serving as a backup to Marc Denis.

On June 30, 2006, Denis was traded to the Tampa Bay Lightning and Leclaire was promoted to starting goalie. However, during the season, Leclaire suffered from a leg injury and backup goaltender Fredrik Norrena took over and eventually played 55 games out of 82. In 2007–08, Leclaire had an outstanding season and regained the number one job. He set new team records with nine shutouts (second in the league only to Henrik Lundqvist), ranked second in the NHL in goals against average, and third in save percentage. Leclaire finished second in fan voting among Western Conference goaltenders for the 56th NHL All-Star Game, but was not named to the final team.

In the 2008–09 season, Leclaire injured his ankle, sidelining him for the season and the Blue Jackets promoted rookie Steve Mason. Mason's play was outstanding, leading the Western Conference in several categories. In a playoff race, the Blue Jackets traded Leclaire to the Ottawa Senators, along with a second-round pick in 2009 (Robin Lehner), in exchange for Antoine Vermette on deadline day March 4, 2009. As expected, Leclaire assumed the role of starting goaltender with the Senators in 2009–10, once he had fully recovered from ankle surgery. However, Leclaire would finish the season backing up Brian Elliott in the Ottawa net, due to inconsistent play and injuries - including a broken cheekbone suffered from being hit by an errant puck while sitting on the bench during a game.  The inconsistency and injuries worsened considerably in 2010–11 with Leclaire playing 14 NHL games and the Senators finishing the year with a top-2 tandem of goaltenders other than those who started the season with the team.  During the season he underwent hip surgery.

As the 2011-12 NHL season began, Leclaire remained unsigned as an unrestricted free agent. He would ultimately sit out the entire season, unable to come to terms on a contract with any team.

On November 12, 2012, on the Reseau des sports program L'Antichambre, Leclaire announced his retirement from hockey. He had undergone three operations on his right hip, from which he was not able to recover.

On October 5, 2005, Leclaire allowed the first career NHL goal scored by Alexander Ovechkin who would eventually have the record for the second most goals in NHL history.

International play

Leclaire competed in the 2002 World Junior Ice Hockey Championships with Canada. He assumed the starting position, recording a 1.80 GAA and two shutouts over five games. Six years later, he joined Canada's men's team at the 2008 IIHF World Championship in Halifax, Nova Scotia. He played in four games, going undefeated while recording a 2.00 GAA. Canada lost in the gold medal game to Russia.

Career statistics

Regular season and playoffs

International

References

External links

1982 births
Binghamton Senators players
Canadian ice hockey goaltenders
Columbus Blue Jackets draft picks
Columbus Blue Jackets players
Halifax Mooseheads players
Ice hockey people from Quebec
Living people
Montreal Rocket players
National Hockey League first-round draft picks
Ottawa Senators players
People from Repentigny, Quebec
Syracuse Crunch players